Sabine Auken ( Zenkel, born 4 January 1965) is a German bridge player. She has also played as Sabine Zenkel. Sometime prior to the 2014 European and World meets (summer and October), she ranked 24th among 73 Women World Grand Masters by world masterpoints (MP) and 4th by placing points that do not decay over time.

She was born in Bamberg, Bavaria. As of 2007 she resides in Charlottenlund, Denmark. She and Jens Auken, a Danish bridge player, have two children, Jens Christian (b. 1995) and Maximilian (b. 1999). Maximillian has had success playing basketball, making the U14, U15 and U16 Danish national teams.

At national level she plays for BC München in the 1. German Bridge-Bundesliga. She, along with Roy Welland and the BC München won the 2017 Team-Bundesliga.

Zenkel and the American professional player Ron Andersen traveled the world as a partnership during 1991–1992, based in Chicago. They also wrote a book, Preempts from A to Z (1993; 2nd, 1996).

Books  

 Preempts from A to Z, Ron Andersen and Sabine Zenkel (Stamford, CT: Magnus Books, 1993), 290 pp., 
 I Love This Game, Auken and Mark Horton, editor (Master Point Press, 2006), 207 pp.,

Bridge accomplishments

Awards
 EBL Bronze Medal (1) 2010
 EBL Hall of Fame (1) 2018

Wins

 Venice Cup (2) 1995, 2001 
 IOC Grand Prix Women Teams (1) 1999
 World Bridge Series (1)
 Mixed Teams (1) 2014
 World Bridge Games (1)
 Open Pairs (1) 2016
 World Transnational Mixed Team Championships (1) 2004
 Buffett Cup (1) 2008
 European Team Championships (3)
 Women Teams (1) 1989
 Women Pairs (3) 1995, 1997, 2001
 European Mixed Championships (3)
 Mixed Teams (1) 2000
 Mixed Pairs (1) 1996
Mixed Pairs (1) 1994
 European Open Bridge Championships (1)
 Open Pairs (1) 2013
 North American Bridge Championships (14)
 Smith Life Master Women's Pairs (2) 1989, 1993 
 Jacoby Open Swiss Teams (1) 2014 
 Machlin Women's Swiss Teams (2) 1990, 2011 
 Vanderbilt (1) 2013 
 Spingold (1) 2016
 Wagar Women's Knockout Teams (3) 2005, 2007, 2011 
 Sternberg Women's Board-a-Match Teams (3) 2005, 2009, 2010 
 Chicago Mixed Board-a-Match (1) 2009

Other notable wins 
Lisbon Masters Invitational 2019

Moscow Invitational Slava Cup 2010, 2016

South American Bridge Championships 2016

German Open Team Championships 2011, 2019

German Bundesliga Pair Championships 2018

German Bundesliga Team Championships 2017

1st Women Pairs Common Market Championships 1985 Bordeaux

Runners-up

 Venice Cup (3) 1993, 2005, 2007 
 World Mixed Pairs (1) 1994
 Open World Women Team Championships 1998
World Women Pairs (2) 1998, 2016
Buffett Cup (2) 2006, 2010
 European Women Team Championships (3) 1991, 1995, 2002
 European Mixed Team Championships (1) 1996
European Mixed Pairs Championships 2017
European Winter Games Board-a-Match 2020
 North American Bridge Championships
 Rockwell Mixed Pairs (1) 1993 
 Blue Ribbon Pairs (1) 2005 
 Smith Life Master Women's Pairs (1) 1992 
 Sternberg Women's Board-a-Match Teams (1) 2002 
 Chicago Mixed Board-a-Match (1) 1994 
 Reisinger (1) 2012

References

External links 
 
 
 Women Stars at the World Bridge Federation – with biography
 
 Sabine Auken at LC Authorities (no records yet; see WorldCat)

1965 births
German contract bridge players
Contract bridge writers
Venice Cup players
Sportspeople from Bamberg
German expatriates in Denmark
Living people